Boana guentheri is a species of frog in the family Hylidae that is endemic to Brazil. Its natural habitats are subtropical or tropical moist lowland forests, subtropical or tropical moist shrubland, freshwater marshes, intermittent freshwater marshes, arable land, pastureland, rural gardens, and seasonally flooded agricultural land.

References

Boana
Endemic fauna of Brazil
Amphibians described in 1886
Taxonomy articles created by Polbot